The acronym ICSA may refer to:

 International Courier Services Association
International Customer Service Association
 Institute of Chartered Secretaries and Administrators
 International Cultic Studies Association
 International Computer Security Association
 Intercollegiate Sailing Association
 Intercollegiate Chinese for Social Action
 Catholic Scout Association in Israel
 International Chinese Statistical Association
 International Coalition for Sustainable Aviation